Påskbergsvallen, currently known as Varberg Energi Arena for sponsorship reasons, is a football and track and field athletics stadium in Varberg, Sweden and the home stadium for the football team Varbergs BoIS. Påskbergsvallen has a total capacity of 4,500 spectators.

It was inaugurated on 2 July 1925 by King Gustaf V of Sweden.

References 

Football venues in Sweden
1925 establishments in Sweden
Sports venues completed in 1925
Athletics (track and field) venues in Sweden